The Monument to Alexander Matrosov is a monument in Ufa.  It is located at Republic House.

Monument to Hero of the Soviet Union Alexander Matrosov was established in Ufa May 9, 1951 in the park renamed in honor of the hero. The monument is made of bronze mounted on a pedestal of pink granite. He is a figure of 2.5 meters in height, full-length in forward motion, with a gun in his hands. On the head of a soldier is a helmet and over his clothing is a cape. The inscription on the pedestal reads: "Hero of the Soviet Union Alexander Matrosov".

References 

Monuments and memorials in Ufa
Statues in Russia
Outdoor sculptures in Russia
1951 establishments in Russia
Sculptures in the Soviet Union
Sculptures of men in Russia
Cultural heritage monuments of regional significance in Bashkortostan